Cheyenne Plains Gas Pipeline is a pipeline that brings gas from the Rocky Mountains to the Midwest. It is owned by El Paso Corporation. Its FERC code is 188.

The system consists of pipeline 36 inches in diameter, in a network spanning 410 miles. It extent begins near the Wyoming-Colorado border, and continues to end near South Central Kansas. Market areas served by the pipeline include areas in the Midwest as well as many other mid-continent pipelines located in South Central Kansas.

References

External links
Cheyenne Plains Gas Pipeline Electronic Bulletin Board
Kinder Morgan – Cheyenne Plains

Natural gas pipelines in the United States